Matheus Nicolau Pereira (born January 6, 1993) is a Brazilian mixed martial artist who is currently competing in the Flyweight division for the Ultimate Fighting Championship (UFC). He has also competed in the Brave Combat Federation (Brave CF) and the Future FC. As of December 6, 2022, he is #5 in the UFC flyweight rankings.

Mixed martial arts career
Nicolau made his professional mixed martial arts debut in August 2010 at the age of 17. He compiled a record of 10-1-1, competing primarily for various regional promotions in Brazil before trying out for The Ultimate Fighter in early 2015.

The Ultimate Fighter
In March 2015, it was announced that Nicolau was one of the fighters selected to be on The Ultimate Fighter: Brazil 4.

In his first fight on the show, Nicolau faced Mateus Vasco. He won the fight via submission (rear-naked choke) in the first round.

In the quarterfinals, Nicolau faced off against Reginaldo Vieira. He won the fight via unanimous decision after three rounds.

In the semifinals, Nicolau faced Dileno Lopes. He lost via unanimous decision.

Ultimate Fighting Championship
Nicolau made his official debut for the promotion on November 7, 2015 at UFC Fight Night 77 where he faced fellow castmate Bruno Rodrigues. He won the fight submission in the third round.

Nicolau next faced John Moraga on July 8, 2016 at The Ultimate Fighter 23 Finale. He won the fight via split decision.

Nicolau was expected to face Ulka Sasaki on November 19, 2016 at UFC Fight Night 100. However Nicolau was pulled from the bout on November 3 after the USADA revealed a potential anti-doping violation from a sample that was taken October 13.

Nicolau faced Louis Smolka on December 30, 2017 at UFC 219. He won the fight via unanimous decision.

Nicolau faced Dustin Ortiz on July 28, 2018 at UFC on Fox 30. He lost the fight via knockout due to a head kick and follow-up punches in the first round.

In February 2019, news surfaced that Nicolau had been released from the UFC.

Future FC
After being released from the UFC, Nicolau signed with Brazilian mixed martial arts promotion Future FC where he fought in the bantamweight division. In his promotional debut he faced Alan Gabriel at Future FC 5 on May 24, 2019. He won the fight via anaconda choke.

In August 2019, it was also announced that Nicolau had signed with Brave CF, making his promotional debut against Felipe Efrain at Brave CF 25 on August 31, 2019. Nicolau won the fight via unanimous decision.

In February 2020, news surfaced that Nicolau would be participating in Brave CF Flyweight tournament. In the initial round, Nicolau was expected to face Jose Torres at Brave CF 35 on March 28, 2020. However, the event was postponed until a to-be-determined date due to the COVID-19 pandemic

Return to UFC 
Nicolau was scheduled to face Tagir Ulanbekov on January 24, 2021 at UFC 257. However, Ulanbekov withdrew due to undisclosed reasons. The pairing was eventually rescheduled for UFC Fight Night 187. However, Ulanbekov withdrew from the bout the second time for undisclosed reason and he was replaced by Manel Kape. He won the fight via controversial split decision. 21 out of 21 media members scored the fight for his opponent Kape.

Nicolau faced Tim Elliott on October 9, 2021 at UFC Fight Night 194. He won the fight via unanimous decision.

Nicolau faced David Dvořák on March 26, 2022 at UFC on ESPN 33. He won the fight by unanimous decision.

Nicolau faced Matt Schnell  on December 3, 2022 at UFC on ESPN 42. He won the bout via knockout in the second round.

Nicolau  is schedule to face Brandon Royval on April 15, 2023 at UFC on ESPN 44.

Mixed martial arts record

|-
|Win
|align=center|19–2–1
|Matt Schnell
|KO (punches)
|UFC on ESPN: Thompson vs. Holland
|
|align=center|2
|align=center|1:44
|Orlando, Florida, United States
|
|-
|Win
|align=center|18–2–1
|David Dvořák
|Decision (unanimous)
|UFC on ESPN: Blaydes vs. Daukaus
|
|align=center|3
|align=center|5:00
|Columbus, Ohio, United States
|
|-
|Win
|align=center|17–2–1
|Tim Elliott
|Decision (unanimous)
|UFC Fight Night: Dern vs. Rodriguez
|
|align=center|3
|align=center|5:00
|Las Vegas, Nevada, United States
|
|-
|Win
|align=center|16–2–1
|Manel Kape
|Decision (split)
|UFC Fight Night: Edwards vs. Muhammad
|
|align=center|3
|align=center|5:00
|Las Vegas, Nevada, United States
|
|-
|Win
|align=center|15–2–1
|Felipe Efrain
|Decision (unanimous)
|Brave CF 25: Santiago vs. Silva
|
|align=center|3
|align=center|5:00
|Belo Horizonte, Brazil
| 
|-
|Win
|align=center|14–2–1
|Alan Gabriel
|Submission (japanese necktie)
|Future FC 5: Alves vs. Ramos
|
|align=center|1
|align=center|1:18
|São Paulo, Brazil
|
|-
|Loss
|align=center|13–2–1
|Dustin Ortiz
|KO (head kick and punches)
|UFC on Fox: Alvarez vs. Poirier 2 
|
|align=center|1
|align=center|3:49
|Calgary, Alberta, Canada
|
|-
|Win
|align=center|13–1–1
|Louis Smolka
|Decision (unanimous)
|UFC 219
|
|align=center|3
|align=center|5:00
|Las Vegas, Nevada, United States
|
|-
|Win
| align=center| 12–1–1
| John Moraga
| Decision (split)
| The Ultimate Fighter: Team Joanna vs. Team Cláudia Finale
| 
| align=center|3
| align=center|5:00
| Las Vegas, Nevada, United States
|
|-
| Win
| align=center| 11–1–1
| Bruno Mesquita
| Submission (japanese necktie)
| UFC Fight Night: Belfort vs. Henderson 3
| 
| align=center| 3
| align=center| 3:27
| São Paulo, Brazil
|
|-
| Win
| align=center| 10–1–1
| Derinaldo Guerra da Silva
| KO (punch)
| Shooto Brazil 49
| 
| align=center| 2
| align=center| 4:35
| Rio de Janeiro, Brazil
| 
|-
| Win
| align=center| 9–1–1
| Pedro Arruda
| KO (punch)
| Brazil Fight 8
| 
| align=center| 1
| align=center| 2:49
| Belo Horizonte, Brazil
|
|- 
| Win
| align=center| 8–1–1
| Vanderlei Carvalho Leite
| Decision (unanimous)
| Shooto Brazil 45
| 
| align=center| 3
| align=center| 5:00
| Rio de Janeiro, Brazil
|
|-
| Loss
| align=center| 7–1–1
| Pedro Nobre
| TKO (punches)
| Bitetti Combat 13
| 
| align=center| 1
| align=center| 3:11
| Rio de Janeiro, Brazil
|
|-
| Win
| align=center| 7–0–1
| Denison Silva
| Decision (unanimous)
| Bitetti Combat 13
| 
| align=center| 2
| align=center| 5:00
| Rio de Janeiro, Brazil
|
|- 
| Win
| align=center| 6–0–1
| Larry Passos Vargas
| KO (punches)
| Brazil Fight 6
| 
| align=center| 3
| align=center| 4:09
| Belo Horizonte, Brazil
|
|- 
| Win
| align=center| 5–0–1
| Gilberto Dias
| Decision (unanimous)
| Shooto Brazil 31
| 
| align=center| 3
| align=center| 5:00
| Brasília, Brazil
|
|- 
| Win
| align=center| 4–0–1
| Michael Daboville
| Submission (triangle choke)
| Lions FC 2
| 
| align=center| 1
| align=center| N/A
| Neuchatel, Switzerland
|
|- 
| Win
| align=center| 3–0–1
| Damien Pighiera
| Submission (arm-triangle choke)
| Lions FC 1
| 
| align=center| 2
| align=center| 4:26
| Neuchatel, Switzerland
|
|- 
| Draw
| align=center| 2–0–1
| Larry Passos Vargas
| Draw (unanimous)
| Brazil Fight 5
| 
| align=center| 3
| align=center| 5:00
| Belo Horizonte, Brazil
|
|- 
| Win
| align=center| 2–0
| Fernando Silva
| TKO (doctor stoppage)
| Brazil Fight 4
| 
| align=center| 2
| align=center| N/A
| Nova Lima, Brazil
|
|- 
| Win
| align=center| 1–0
| Pedro Alves Chalita
| Submission (rear-naked choke)
| Pedro Leopoldo Extreme Fight
| 
| align=center| 1
| align=center| 1:35
| Pedro Leopoldo, Brazil
|
|-

Mixed martial arts exhibition record

|-
|Loss
|align=center| 2–1
|Dileno Lopes
|Decision (unanimous)
|The Ultimate Fighter: Brazil 4
| (airdate)
|align=center|3
|align=center|5:00
|Las Vegas, Nevada, United States
|
|-
|Win 
|align=center| 2–0
|Reginaldo Vieira
|Decision (unanimous) 
|The Ultimate Fighter: Brazil 4
| (airdate)
|align=center|3
|align=center|5:00
|Las Vegas, Nevada, United States
|
|- 
|Win 
|align=center| 1–0
|Mateus Vasco
|Submission (rear-naked choke) 
|The Ultimate Fighter: Brazil 4
| (airdate)
|align=center|1
|align=center|3:46
|Las Vegas, Nevada, United States
|
|-

See also

 List of current UFC fighters
 List of male mixed martial artists

References

External links
 
 

1993 births
Living people
Brazilian male mixed martial artists
Flyweight mixed martial artists
Mixed martial artists utilizing Brazilian jiu-jitsu
Sportspeople from Belo Horizonte
Brazilian practitioners of Brazilian jiu-jitsu
People awarded a black belt in Brazilian jiu-jitsu
Ultimate Fighting Championship male fighters